IPCS (or ipcs) can refer to:

The Institute of Postcolonial Studies, an independent educational and research institution in Melbourne
Institution of Professional Civil Servants, a former British trade union
International Programme on Chemical Safety, a United Nations organization
ipcs, a UNIX command
Interactive Problem Control System, a dump-reading facility in OS/360 and successors
 The International Playing-Card Society

See also
IPC (disambiguation)